Janet Burton is professor of medieval history at the University of Wales Trinity Saint David.  She researches medieval monasticism, religious orders and congregations. She is a Fellow of the Society of Antiquaries, the Royal Historical Society, and the Learned Society of Wales. She initiated the Monastic Wales project in July 2007 to research and disseminate knowledge on the medieval monasteries of Wales.

Research 
She has researched widely on medieval monasticism, with particular focus on regional contexts of Yorkshire and Wales. She has also worked on the Cistercians, regular canons, and religious women. With Karen Stöber, she founded the Monastic Wales project in July 2007. This project aims to establish a comprehensive monastic history of medieval Wales, communicating findings to both academics and the public.

Career 
She studied history at the University of London. She then completed her DPhil in the Department of History and Centre for Medieval Studies at the University of York, studying the monastic houses of Yorkshire in the 150 years after the Norman Conquest. She subsequently worked as an archivist in York and Aberystwyth, alongside teaching at the University of Wales, Lampeter, working for the York Archaeological Trust, English Heritage and the Vatican. She has been Professor of Medieval History since 2006.

Key works 
Burton is the author or editor of 12 books on medieval monasticism. Key works include:
 Monastic and Religious Orders in Britain 1000–1300 
 The Monastic Order in Yorkshire 1066–1215
 Monastic Wales: New Approaches, ed. Janet Burton and Karen Stöber

Media work 
Burton has appeared on several episodes of Time Team as a historical expert. She also featured on Dan Snow's Norman Walks on the abbeys of medieval Yorkshire.

References 

Living people
Historians of Wales
20th-century Welsh historians
21st-century Welsh educators
21st-century Welsh women writers
21st-century Welsh writers
British women historians
Year of birth missing (living people)
Fellows of the Society of Antiquaries of London
Fellows of the Royal Historical Society
Fellows of the Learned Society of Wales
21st-century women educators
21st-century Welsh historians
Academics of the University of Wales Trinity Saint David
Welsh women academics